The NWA Mountain Empire Championship was originally created to replace the NWA Smoky Mountain Television Championship.  On March 24, 2011; Chase Owens defeated Jason Kincaid to become the first champion.  On August 19, 2017; at ReGenesis, promoter Tony Givens announced that NWA Smoky Mountain Wrestling was leaving the NWA thus the promotion was changing their name to Innovate Wrestling and the NWA Mountain Empire Championship Championship was officially retired as a result. Toby Farley defeated Timmy Lou Retton to become the Interim Innovate Wrestling United States Champion.

Title history

Reigns

Combined reigns

National Wrestling Alliance championships